Adam William Polkinghorne (born 23 August 1975) is an Australian former cricket player, who played as an all-rounder for the Tasmanian Tigers. He is more of a bowling all-rounder, and his fast-medium deliveries are difficult to score from. As a batsman he is a useful left-handed hitter who likes to slog down the order. As of 2006 he has so far yet to be able to transfer his exploits for club side South Hobart/Sandy Bay Sharks, where his club efforts have seen him named club player of the year four times.

1975 births
Living people
Australian cricketers
Tasmania cricketers